Evening Sun  may refer to:
 a sunflower variety
 That Evening Sun, a novel
 That Evening Sun (film)
 The Evening Sun, the evening edition of The Baltimore Sun
 The Evening Sun, the evening edition of New York's The Sun launched in 1887
 Hanover Evening Sun, Hanover, Pennsylvania